is a Japanese manga artist from Nagano in Japan and is best known for Orange.

Biography 
Takano made her debut in high school in 2002 with START. She first achieved success with her work Dreamin' Sun. Takano is also the creator and author of New York Times bestseller Orange. After beginning serialization in Shueisha's Bessatsu Margaret in 2012, Orange was abruptly suspended from the January 2013 issue. It was later picked up by Futabasha's Monthly Action in February 2014 where it continued to be serialized until 2015.

Works 
 START (2002) – (serialized in Shueisha's Bessatsu Margaret)
 Ookami Shounen (オオカミ少年) (2004) – (serialized in Shuiesha's Margaret)
 Itoshi Kingyo (愛し金魚) (2006) – (serialized in Bessatsu Margaret)
 Shooting Star (シューティング スター) (2006)
 Bambi no Tegami (バンビの手紙) (2007) – (serialized in Bessatsu Margaret)
 Dreamin' Sun (夢みる太陽) (2007-2011) – (serialized in Bessatsu Margaret)
 Orange (2012-2017) – (serialized in Futabasha's Monthly Action)
 Orange (2015-2016) – (light novel)
 ReCollection (2013-) – (serialized in Monthly Action) 
 Kimi ni Nare (君になれ) (2018-) – (serialized in Monthly Action)

Filmography 
In 2015, the film Orange was released based on the manga in Japan. A 13-episode anime adaptation of Orange was produced by Telecom Animation Film in 2016 and was simulcast by Crunchyroll.

References

External links 
 Choco De Net (official website)

1986 births
Living people
Manga artists from Nagano Prefecture